Mary Robinette Kowal (born February 8, 1969) is an American author and puppeteer. Originally a puppeteer by primary trade after receiving a bachelor's degree in art education, she became art director for science fiction magazines and by 2010 was also authoring her first full-length published novels. The majority of her work is characterized by science fiction themes, such as interplanetary travel; a common element present in many of her novels is historical or alternate history fantasy, such as in her Glamourist Histories and Lady Astronaut books. 

Kowal has been active in the SF&F community, acting as secretary, vice president (2010), and later president (2019-2021) of the Science Fiction and Fantasy Writers of America. In response to frustration from the fanbase over panel selection, and perceived misallocation of resources in advance of the 2018 WorldCon, the board named her chair of programming. She has since returned as a chair at the 2021 WorldCon, which was delayed to mid-December 2021 on account of COVID-19. 

Professional magazines such as Asimov's and Uncanny have published her stories across the years, since "Portrait of Ari" was picked up by Strange Horizons in 2006, which eventually resulted in an Astounding Award for Best New Writer. Tor Books has been the main avenue for her longer fiction. Both her novels and short fiction have received praise and accolades, including (though not limited to) four Hugo Awards and a single Nebula Award. The Calculating Stars, perhaps her most decorated and recognizable work, won both the Hugo Award for Best Novel and the Nebula Award for Best Novel. 

She continues to write and puppeteer, in addition to voicing audio books, and lives in Nashville with her husband.

Life and career
Mary Robinette Harrison was born in Raleigh, North Carolina, attended William G. Enloe High School, and studied at East Carolina University. She graduated with a degree in Art Education with a minor in theater and began work as a professional puppeteer in 1989.

She has performed for the Center for Puppetry Arts; Jim Henson Productions; and her own production company, Other Hand Productions. She also worked in Iceland on the children's television show LazyTown for two seasons. She was accepted as a participant in a Sesame Puppetry Workshop.

Kowal served as art director for Shimmer Magazine and in 2010 was named art director for Weird Tales. She served as secretary of the Science Fiction and Fantasy Writers of America for two years, was elected to the position of SFWA Vice President in 2010, and was elected SFWA President in 2019. In 2008, her second year of eligibility, she won the John W. Campbell Award for Best New Writer.

Kowal's work as an author includes "For Solo Cello, op. 12," (originally published in Cosmos Magazine and reprinted in Science Fiction: The Best of the Year, 2008 Edition,) which made the preliminary ballot for the 2007 Nebula Awards. Her fiction has also appeared in Talebones Magazine, Strange Horizons, and Apex Digest, among other venues. Her debut novel Shades of Milk and Honey was nominated for the 2010 Nebula Award for Best Novel. Two of her short fiction works have been nominated for the Hugo Award for Best Short Story: "Evil Robot Monkey" in 2009 and "For Want of a Nail," which won the award in 2011. Her novelette, The Lady Astronaut of Mars was ineligible for the 2013 Hugo Award for Best Novelette because it had only been released as part of an audiobook, but was later published in text format and went on to win the 2014 Hugo Award for Best Novelette. The Calculating Stars, the first novel in her Lady Astronaut series, won the 2019 Hugo Award for Best Novel, the 2018 Nebula Award for Best Novel, and the 2018 Sidewise Award for Alternate History.

After appearing several times as a guest star in the podcast, Writing Excuses, she became a full-time cast member at the start of the sixth season in 2011.

Kowal is also a voice actor and recorded audiobook versions of books written by other authors such as John Scalzi, Seanan McGuire, Cory Doctorow and Kage Baker.

In July 2018, after criticism  that many authors who were Hugo award finalists at the August 2018 World Science Fiction Convention had not been selected to participate on that year's panels, Kowal took over as Programming chair and "repaired and replaced" many sessions by working with a large and diverse team to do so.

Kowal served as President of the Science Fiction and Fantasy Writers of America from 2019-2021.

Kowal served as Chair of the DisCon III the 2021 Worldcon after the original Chairs resigned.

Awards and nominations

Publications

Glamourist Histories series
Shades of Milk and Honey, Tor Books, 2010, 
Glamour in Glass, Tor Books, 2012, 
Without a Summer, Tor Books, 2013, 
Valour and Vanity, Tor Books, 2014, 
Of Noble Family, Tor Books, 2015,

Lady Astronaut Universe
"The Lady Astronaut of Mars", Audible (store) and Science Fiction and Fantasy Writers of America, 2012, (winner of the Hugo Award for Best Novelette)
The Calculating Stars, Tor Books, 2018,  (winner of the Hugo Award for Best Novel and the Nebula Award for Best Novel)
The Fated Sky, Tor Books, 2018, 
The Relentless Moon, Tor Books, 2020, 
The Martian Contingency, Tor Books, announced for 2022

Standalone novels
Ghost Talkers, Tor Books, 2016, 
The Spare Man, Tor Books, 2022

Novellas 
 Kiss Me Twice, Asimov's Science Fiction, 2011 (nominated for the Hugo Award for Best Novella)
 Forest of Memory, Tor.com / maryrobinettekowal.com, 2014

Novelettes 
 "A Fire in the Heavens", Shadows Beneath anthology, 2014
"The Worshipful Society of Glovers" (Uncanny 7-8/17)

Collections
Scenting the Dark and Other Stories, Subterranean Press, 2009, 
Word Puppets, Prime Books, 2015,

Short stories
"Just Right", The First Line, 2004
"Rampion", The First Line, 2004
"The Shocking Affair of the Dutch Steamship Friesland", The First Line, 2004
"Portrait of Ari", Strange Horizons, 2006
"Bound Man", Twenty Epics, 2006
"Cerbo in Vitra ujo", Apex Digest, 2006
"Locked In", Apex Digest, 2006
"This Little Pig", Cicada, 2007
"For Solo Cello, op. 12", Cosmos, 2007
"Horizontal Rain", Apex Online, 2007
"Death Comes But Twice", Talebones, 2007
"Some Other Day", All Possible Worlds, 2007
"Tomorrow and Tomorrow", Gratia Placenti, 2007
"Suspension and Disbelief", Doctor Who: Short Trips: Destination Prague, 2007
"Clockwork Chickadee", Clarkesworld Magazine, 2008
"Scenting the Dark", Apex Online, 2008
"Waiting for Rain", Subterranean Magazine, 2008
"Chrysalis", Aoife’s Kiss, 2008
"Evil Robot Monkey", The Solaris Book of New Science Fiction, Vol. 2, 2008 (nominated for the Hugo Award for Best Short Story)
"At the Edge of Dying", Clockwork Phoenix 2: More Tales of Beauty and Strangeness, 2009
"Body Language", InterGalactic Medicine Show, 2009
"The Consciousness Problem", Asimov's Science Fiction, 2009
"First Flight", Tor.com, 2009
"Ginger Stuyvesant and the Case of the Haunted Nursery", Talebones, 2009
"Jaiden’s Weaver", Diamonds in the Sky: An Astronomical Anthology, 2009
"Prayer at Dark River", Innsmouth Free Press, 2009
"Ring Road", Dark Faith Anthology, 2010
"The Bride Replete", Apex Online, 2010
"Beyond the Garden Close", Apex Online, 2010
"Typewriter Triptych", Sharable.net, 2010
"For Want of a Nail", Asimov's Science Fiction, 2010 (winner of the Hugo Award for Best Short Story)
"Salt of the Earth", Redstone Science Fiction, 2010
"American Changeling", Daily Science Fiction, 2010
"Changement d’itinéraire (Changed Itinerary)", Légendes, 2010
"Birthright", 2020 Visions, 2010
"Water to Wine", METAtropolis: Cascadia, 2010
"Weaving Dreams", Apex, 2012
"The White Phoenix Feather", Fireside Magazine, 2012
"We Interrupt This Broadcast", The Mad Scientist's Guide to World Domination, 2013 - part of the Lady Astronaut Universe series
"Midnight Hour", Uncanny Magazine, 2015
"Grinding Time", Popular Science, 2015
"Your Mama's Adventures in Parenting", Shimmer, 2017
"Dust to Dust", Fireside Fiction, 2018
"Amara's Giraffe", May 2018 - part of the Lady Astronaut Universe series
"Rockets Red", July 2018 - part of the Lady Astronaut Universe series
"The Phobos Experience" - in Fantasy & Science Fiction July 2018 - part of the Lady Astronaut Universe series
"Articulated Restraint", Tor.com, 2019 - part of the Lady Astronaut Universe series

Audio originals 
"The Original", Dragonsteel Entertainment, 2020

Children's books 

 Molly on the Moon, ill. Diana Mayo, Roaring Brook Press, 2022, ISBN 9781250259615

References

External links 

Mary Robinette Kowal's Weekly Fantasy Column at AMCtv.com 

1969 births
Living people
21st-century American novelists
21st-century American short story writers
21st-century American women writers
American alternate history writers
American podcasters
American puppeteers
American science fiction writers
American women novelists
American women podcasters
American women short story writers
East Carolina University alumni
Hugo Award-winning writers
John W. Campbell Award for Best New Writer winners
Nebula Award winners
Novelists from North Carolina
Sidewise Award winners
William G. Enloe High School alumni
Women science fiction and fantasy writers
Writers from Raleigh, North Carolina